King Peninsula is an ice-covered peninsula,  long and  wide, lying south of Thurston Island and forming the south side of Peacock Sound, Antarctica. It projects from the continental ice sheet and trends west between the Abbot Ice Shelf and Cosgrove Ice Shelf to terminate at the Amundsen Sea. The feature was photographed from the air by U.S. Navy Operation HIGHJUMP, 1946–47, and was plotted from these photos as a long island, or possible peninsula. Photos taken by the U.S. Navy in 1966 show it is a peninsula, ⁣but the U.S. Board on Geographic Names published its list of names that same year and designated the area as an island.

King Peninsula was named by the Advisory Committee on Antarctic Names for Fleet Admiral Ernest J. King, U.S. Navy, Chief of Naval Operations from 1942 to 1945, who approved the preliminary work for Operation HIGHJUMP.

References

Peninsulas of Ellsworth Land